Clyde River is a stream in Alberta, Canada.

Clyde River has the name of Clyde White, a government surveyor.

See also
List of rivers of Alberta

References

Rivers of Alberta